is an eroge visual novel by Leaf. It is a suspense adventure game dealing with psychological warfare as players are pitted against a cunning and powerful criminal while trapped in the open sea on a cruise ship.

Although this game produced Leaf, much of the staff for this game was outsourced. This was because the game was outside of the fantasy or true love scenario games that have become the company's backbone. Instead the game had twisted dark scenarios.

As the game's story progresses, game play revolves around the player making the correct selections and collecting items. If the wrong selections are made, or an item missed, the story will eventually conclude abruptly with death and game over. The goal is to kill the criminal on board, which may happen in one of 9 different endings in the game. These multiple endings range greatly, from a happy ending, to twisted bad endings.

Story
The stage of this tale is set inside the high speed experimental ship Basilisk. Kyosuke Koduki, the game's protagonist, is invited on the ship's maiden test voyage as a guest by his friend's mother. When the ship finds castaway Yoichi Kishida, things go horribly wrong for the voyage.

Characters
  The male protagonist of the game. A high school student who has lost his father at a young age. The tender-hearted elder brother of Chihaya, and reliable guy among his friends. CV:Daisuke Ono
  A long-time childhood friend of Kyosuke, and daughter of Shino. A gentle girl with strong convictions. CV:Ryōko Ono
  A reserved and precocious girl. Because she tries hard not to display her feelings, she is hard to read. CV:Yuria Hokuto
  The eldest daughter of a noble family and  sister of Tamami. A brash elitist with a large ego. CV:Yuka Tanaka
  The younger sister of Karen, although she is only one year younger than her sister, she looks and acts many years younger. Despite her immaturity and propensity to play pranks, she is quite clever at MacGyver-ing items. CV:Asuka Tanii
 Kyosuke's younger sister. Although constitutionally weak, she  is very strong-willed girl, because of the loss of her father at a young age. Highly attached to her brother. CV:Ryu Ueto
  Kyosuke's best friend by circumstance of sharing the same interests. He is very vain and patronizing person, who is very self-centered.
  Mother of Akeno, and the chief person in charge of the "BaShiRiSuKu" voyage. She is the one that invites everyone on the ship's maiden test voyage. A very accepting and generous woman. CV:Kaoru Shinomiya
 A man found adrift at sea. Claiming to be a marine researcher, he boards the ship, and murders the ship's crew. A fearsome person skilled at psychological manipulation and terror tactics. CV:Kenji Hamada

Release and sales
Kusari was the fifth top selling computer game on getchu.com for the month of its release, and it was the 44th top selling eroge for 2005. Although these are very good sales overall, they pale in comparison to many of Leaf's other titles, most notably against Leaf's To Heart 2 XRATED  which ranked #1 in the same year.

Source code scandal
Kusari was one of four games (Aruruu to Asobo!!, Tears to Tiara, Kusari and ToHeart2 XRATED) Leaf was forced to release its source code to the public due to having used the Xvid video codec in the game without complying to the software's license. XVid is licensed under the GNU Public license, which requires that programs using the codec to make their source code available to program users. A source code mirror is hosted on a GitHub repository.

References

External links
Official website 

2005 video games
Bishōjo games
Commercial video games with freely available source code
Eroge
Japan-exclusive video games
Leaf (Japanese company) games
Single-player video games
Video games developed in Japan
Visual novels
Windows games
Windows-only games
Aquaplus games